Bojnu may refer to:
 Bojnu-ye Olya